Brodnica is a town in Poland.

Brodnica may also refer to:

Sparta Brodnica, a Polish football club playing currently in Polish Fourth League
Brodnica Landscape Park, a protected area (Landscape Park) in north-central Poland, established in 1985
Brodnica County, a unit of territorial administration and local government (powiat) in Kuyavian-Pomeranian Voivodeship
Brodnica, Greater Poland Voivodeship, a village in Śrem County, Greater Poland Voivodeship
Brodnica Dolna, a village in the administrative district of Gmina Kartuzy
Brodnica Górna, a village in Kartuzy County, Pomeranian Voivodeship, Poland
Gmina Brodnica (disambiguation), multiple administrative districts in Poland

See also
Brodnicki